Wuhan Vocational College of Software and Engineering (WHVCSE), located in Wuhan, China, is a vocational college of higher education. There are more than 700 faculty staff and more than 14,000 students.

History
WHVCSE was founded by combining two vocational colleges, Wuhan Vocational College of Software and Wuhan Vocational College of Industry and Traffic, in 2007.

Departments
School of Computer and Software
Department of Mechanical Manufacture Engineering
Department of Electronic and Electrical Engineering
Department of Photoelectron and Communication Engineering
Department of Automobile Application Engineering
Department of Economics and Management
Department of Art and Design
Department of Environmental and Bio-chemical Engineering
Department of Fundamental Courses and Department of Physical Education

Notes

External links

Universities and colleges in Wuhan
Educational institutions established in 1979